Major General Kenneth Lloyd Farmer Jr. (born April 13, 1950) commanded Walter Reed Army Medical Center and North Atlantic Regional Medical Command from June 2004 to August 2006.

Biography
A family practice physician, he earned a Bachelor of Science degree from Auburn University, and a medical degree from the University of Alabama at Birmingham in Birmingham, Alabama. He received his medical specialty training at Eisenhower Army Medical Center, Fort Gordon, Georgia, and at Madigan Army Medical Center, Fort Lewis, Washington. He is also a graduate of the Army's Command and General Staff College and the Army War College.
 
Farmer commanded the North Atlantic Regional Medical Command and Walter Reed Army Medical Center from June 2004 to August 25, 2006. Prior to this, Farmer served as the Deputy Surgeon General for the U.S. Army and as the chief of staff for U.S. Army Medical Command.

Farmer grew up in Leeds, Alabama. His father, Kenneth L. Farmer, Sr., was a prisoner of war during World War II and survivor of the Bataan Death March. Farmer and his wife have four adult sons.

Awards
His military awards and decorations include Distinguished Service Medal, Defense Superior Service Medal (two awards), the Legion of Merit (four awards), the Bronze Star, the Defense Meritorious Service Medal, the Meritorious Service Medal (four awards), the Army Commendation Medal, the Army Achievement Medal (two awards), and various service and unit awards. He holds the Expert Field Medical Badge, the Parachutist Badge, the Air Assault Badge, and is an Army flight surgeon. He has also been awarded the Order of Military Medical Merit.

Walter Reed Army Medical Center Controversy
In February 2007, The Washington Post ran a series of articles about the shoddy conditions maintained at Walter Reed Army Medical Center. These revelations led to the firing of then-commander of Walter Reed, Maj. Gen. George W. Weightman, as well as Weightman's successor, Lt. Gen. Kevin C. Kiley. Kiley, who preceded Farmer as commander of Walter Reed, served as acting commander for a single day after Weightman was relieved of duty. The problems at Walter Reed would have occurred during the tenures of Kiley, Farmer and Weightman.

See also
Surgeon General of the United States Army
Walter Reed Army Medical Center

References

United States Army generals
Recipients of the Distinguished Service Medal (US Army)
Recipients of the Legion of Merit
Living people
United States Army Command and General Staff College alumni
Place of birth missing (living people)
1950 births
People from Leeds, Alabama
Auburn University alumni
University of Alabama School of Medicine alumni
Recipients of the Defense Superior Service Medal